Iosif Vigu (born 15 May 1946) is a Romanian former footballer who played as a left back. He was also a manager.

Club career
Iosif Vigu was born on 15 May 1946 in Șimian, Bihor, Romania, starting to play football at the junior squads of Crișul Oradea, moving in 1983 at Flamura Roșie Oradea where he started his senior career in Divizia B. After a short period spent at Olimpia Oradea in Divizia C, Vigu went to play for Crișul Oradea in Divizia A where he was debuted by coach Ladislau Zilahi on 4 April 1965 in a 1–0 away loss against Minerul Baia Mare. In 1966 he went to play for Steaua București where he stayed until 1980, with a interruption in the 1973–74 season when he was loaned at FC Constanța. He won his first Divizia A title in the 1967–68 season, being used by coach Ștefan Kovács in 4 matches in which he scored two goals, winning two more in the 1975–76 and 1977–78 seasons, being used by coach Emerich Jenei in 34 matches in each, in the first he also scored three goals. During his period spent with The Military Men he also won five Cupa României and played 21 games with one goal scored in European competitions, taking part in the 1971–72 European Cup Winners' Cup campaign, playing all six games as the team reached the quarter-finals by eliminating Hibernians and Barcelona, being eliminated after 1–1 on aggregate on the away goal rule by Bayern Munich. In the 1980–81 season, Vigu played for ASA Târgu Mureș for which he made his last Divizia A appearance on 21 June 1981 in a 3–0 home victory against Politehnica Timișoara, having a total of 404 appearances with 34 goals scored in the competition, also as he is the first player that reached 400 appearances in Divizia A and because of that every time a footballer reaches 400 appearances in the Romanian top-league, the press says he entered the "Iosif Vigu Club". Iosif Vigu ended his playing career in 1982 after spending one season in Divizia C at ASA Chimia Buzău.

International career
Iosif Vigu played at international level in 22 matches for Romania and scored 2 goals, making his debut under coach Angelo Niculescu in a Euro 1972 qualification match which ended with a 3–0 victory against Finland. He scored his first goal in a 4–0 victory against Turkey at the 1977–80 Balkan Cup. Vigu played four games at the 1978 World Cup qualifiers, opening the score in a 6–4 loss against Yugoslavia. At the Euro 1980 qualifiers Vigu appeared in two games, a 3–2 home victory against Yugoslavia and a 1–0 away loss against Spain. He also played two games for Romania's Olympic team without scoring.

International goals
Scores and results list Romania's goal tally first, score column indicates score after each Vigu goal.

Managerial career
Iosif Vigu coached teams mostly from the Romanian lower leagues such as ASA Chimia Buzău, Olimpia Satu Mare, Minerul Turț, Armătura Zalău and Someșul Satu Mare and contributed to the formation of footballers Tiberiu Csik, Zoltan Ritli, Daniel Prodan and Gábor Gerstenmájer. He had only a short spell in Divizia A when he coached Minerul Baia Mare in four games from the 1994–95 season.

Honours
Steaua București
Divizia A: 1967–68, 1975–76, 1977–78
Cupa României: 1966–67, 1968–69, 1969–70, 1970–71, 1975–76, 1978–79

References

External links
 
 

1946 births
Living people
Romanian footballers
Romania international footballers
Association football defenders
Liga I players
Liga II players
FC Bihor Oradea players
FC Steaua București players
FCV Farul Constanța players
ASA Târgu Mureș (1962) players
Romanian football managers
FC Olimpia Satu Mare managers